Seamen's Institute was an institute training seamen in Hong Kong located at 8, Praya East which is now the Harcourt Building at Gloucester Road, Wan Chai.

In the early days of Hong Kong Scouting, the Boy Scouts Association, Hong Kong Branch conducted non-regular activities in the institute.  The Colony Commissioner, the Reverend George Turner Waldegrave, of the branch was the chaplain in charge of the Seamen's Institute.

Wan Chai
Scouting and Guiding in Hong Kong